The Badger is the fortnightly newspaper of the University of Sussex's Students' Union.

The paper has a fortnightly circulation of around 1,000 available to students and staff at the university during term-time, covering news and sport on campus, as well as comment pieces, features, lifestyle and arts coverage. It also publishes content online. In 2022-23 the appointed Editor is Ali Arief (Editor-in-Chief), the appointed Print Production Editor is Olly DeHerrera and the Online Production Editor is Charlie Batten. 

The paper used to run as a weekly publication from its inception until 2017 and is the only print and online newspaper that serves the University of Sussex.

It is one of five student media outlets at the University, alongside the student TV station - UniTV, URF - the student radio station, The Channel - the student arts magazine, Fabrik - the student fashion magazine.

History

The Badger began in October 1995, having formerly been known as Unionews since the 1970s. The paper has since covered a variety of stories, including several on-campus occupations and the expulsion of five Sussex students for involvement in protests.

The Newspaper was embroiled in a scandal in 2015 when its own students' union seized copies of the newspaper and prevented them from being distributed, which also forced the then editor to resign. The University of Sussex Students' Union claimed the papers were seized due to the potential for legal action against them. This stemmed from an article written about legal action taken by a student against the University.

In 2017, journalists from the newspaper were accused of 'fake news' and Sun level journalism by a senior member of staff, Professor Laurence Pearl, then head of the Life Sciences Department, after the paper ran a story on problems within the school. Professor Pearl stood down from his position towards the end of the year of publication.

Awards

The Badger has previously been nominated for and won awards from the Student Publication Association, a body for student newspapers in the United Kingdom and Ireland. This includes winning an award for Best Sports Coverage in 2014, and former Editor, Daniel Green, being highly commended for their Outstanding Achievement award in 2016. In 2016 The Badger was nominated for Best Sports Coverage and for Best Comment/Opinion Piece. In 2022, the appointed Editor, Georgia Keetch won a SPA award for Outstanding Commitment.

References

External links 
 The Badgers website
 Sussex Students' Unions The Badger page

Student newspapers published in the United Kingdom
University of Sussex